Julie Elizabeth Murray (born 28 April 1970) is an Australian soccer player who appeared in 68 international matches for the Australia women's national association football team during a 13-year international career. She played professional club football in Denmark and the United States.

International career

Murray attended the 1986 OFC Women's Nations Cup as a 15-year-old, and played against New Zealand's B team during the tournament. Her first full cap – and first goal – came in a 6–0 win over Hong Kong at the following year's Women's World Invitational Tournament in Taiwan. She played in all four matches as Australia made it to the quarter-finals of the 1988 FIFA Women's Invitation Tournament.

References

External links
 
CyberRays profile

Australian women's soccer players
Australian expatriate women's soccer players
Living people
Fortuna Hjørring players
Women's United Soccer Association players
San Jose CyberRays players
Footballers at the 2000 Summer Olympics
1995 FIFA Women's World Cup players
1999 FIFA Women's World Cup players
Olympic soccer players of Australia
1970 births
Australia women's international soccer players
Women's association football midfielders
Women's association football forwards
Expatriate women's soccer players in the United States
Expatriate women's footballers in Denmark
Australian expatriate sportspeople in the United States
Australian expatriate sportspeople in Denmark
ACT Academy of Sport alumni